Fundación is a town and municipality of the Colombian Department of Magdalena.  Its people are known as Fundanenses.    The primary economic activity is livestock-raising, for production of both meat and milk.  Other crops are: corn, yuca, oranges, bananas, beans, sesame, sorghum, rice, tomatoes, and tobacco.  There is also artisanal fishing.

Physically, the area of Fundación consists of river valley, flood plain and some low-lying hills.  The municipio is bounded on the north by Aracataca, on the east by Bosconia, on the south by Chibolo, and, on the west by Pivijay, Sabanas de San Angel, and Algarrobo. The town is crossed by the Fundación River.

The town came to international prominence on 18 May 2014 when a school bus caught fire at the local Pentecostal Church. Thirty two children who had just attended a church service died in the fire.

 Population: 82, 532
 Elevation: 45 meters
 Area: 922 km².

Points of interest
 Bridge over the Fundación River
 Chapel of the Holy Family College
 Church of Our Lord of Miracles
 Church of Maria Auxiliadora
 Fountain of the Barrio Vera Judith
 Los Varones Park

References

External links
 Fundacion official website
 Government of Magdalena: Fundación

Municipalities of Magdalena Department